Hicham Misbah (born 1 February 1977) is a retired Moroccan football midfielder.

References

1977 births
Living people
Moroccan footballers
Footballers from Casablanca
Raja CA players
SCC Mohammédia players
Ittihad Tanger players
Botola players
Morocco international footballers
Association football midfielders